Youssef Baba (born 7 August 1979) is a retired middle-distance runner from Morocco. He competed in the 1500 m event at the 2000, 2004 and 2008 Olympics with the best result of 12th place in 2000.

References

External links
 
 
 

1979 births
Living people
People from Khenifra
Moroccan male middle-distance runners
Olympic athletes of Morocco
Athletes (track and field) at the 2000 Summer Olympics
Athletes (track and field) at the 2004 Summer Olympics
Athletes (track and field) at the 2008 Summer Olympics
World Athletics Championships athletes for Morocco
Fenerbahçe athletes